The 2017 FIBA Under-17 Oceania Championship was an international under-17 basketball tournament held from 10–15 July 2017 by FIBA Oceania in Hagatna, Guam.  Australia subdued New Zealand in the Finals, 93–55, to take the Gold Medal and the fifth consecutive U17 title. Both teams will now move on to the 2018 FIBA Under-18 Asian Championship which in turn the qualifying tournament for the 2019 FIBA Under-19 Basketball World Cup

Hosts Selection
On 23 September 2016, FIBA Oceania announced during their Board Meeting that Guam will host the tournament. The Calvo Field House of the University of Guam in Hagatna will be the main venue for the championship.

Participating teams
On 13 April 2017, the following teams confirmed their participation to the main tournament:

Draw
On 12 May 2017, the draw for the main tournament was held in Hagatna, Guam.

Group phase
All times are in Chamorro Time Zone (UTC+10:00)

Group A

Group B

Final phase

Division B

Bronze-medal game

Gold-medal game

Division A

Semifinals

Bronze-medal game

Gold-medal game

References

External links 
 FIBA U-17 Oceania Championship

2017–18 in Oceanian basketball
2017 in Guamanian sports
International basketball competitions hosted by the United States
FIBA Oceania Under-16 Championship
Basketball in Guam
July 2017 sports events in Oceania
International sports competitions hosted by Guam